5Z or 5-Z may refer to:

5Z, IATA code for CemAir
5Z, the production code for the 1982 Doctor Who serial Castrovalva
R5D-5Z, a variant model of Douglas C-54 Skymaster
R4D-5Z, a variant model of Douglas C-47 Skytrain

See also
Z5 (disambiguation)